Romeo Zhivikj - Roki was a member of the Macedonian underground. He was held hostage by the ANA in 2001 and then released. He was killed in a shootout in the Pella Square in Skopje, in 2004.

See also
List of people from Kumanovo

References

1962 births
2004 deaths
People from Kumanovo
Macedonian gangsters
Serbs of North Macedonia